The 1979 Limosin International was a non-ranking invitational snooker tournament which took place from 9 to 20 July 1979.
The tournament was played at the Good Hope Centre in Cape Town, and featured six professional players alongside two South African amateurs, Mannie Francisco and his brother Silvino.

Eddie Charlton won the title, beating John Spencer 23–19 in the final.

Main draw

References

Limosin International
Limosin International
Sport in South Africa
Limosin International
Snooker in South Africa